A micro air vehicle (MAV), or micro aerial vehicle, is a class of miniature UAVs that has a size restriction and may be autonomous. Modern craft can be as small as 5 centimeters. Development is driven by commercial, research, government, and military purposes; with insect-sized aircraft reportedly expected in the future. The small craft allows remote observation of hazardous environments inaccessible to ground vehicles. MAVs have been built for hobby purposes, such as aerial robotics contests and aerial photography.

Practical implementations
In 2008, the TU Delft University in the Netherlands developed the smallest ornithopter fitted with a camera, the DelFly Micro, the third version of the DelFly project that started in 2005. This version measures 10 centimeters and weighs 3 grams, slightly larger (and noisier) than the dragonfly on which it was modeled. The importance of the camera lies in remote control when the DelFly is out of sight. However, this version has not yet been successfully tested outside, although it performs well indoors. Researcher David Lentink of Wageningen University, who participated in the development of previous models, DelFly I and DelFly II, says it will take at least half a century to mimic the capabilities of insects, with their low energy consumption and multitude of sensors—not only eyes, but gyroscopes, wind sensors, and much more. He says fly-size ornithopters should be possible, provided the tail is well designed. Rick Ruijsink of TU Delft cites battery weight as the biggest problem; the lithium-ion battery in the DelFly micro, at one gram, constitutes a third of the weight. Luckily, developments in this area are still going very fast, due to the demand in various other commercial fields.

Ruijsink says the purpose of these crafts is to understand insect flight and to provide practical uses, such as flying through cracks in concrete to search for earthquake victims or exploring radioactivity-contaminated buildings. Spy agencies and the military also see potential for such small vehicles as spies and scouts.

Robert Wood at Harvard University developed an even smaller ornithopter, at just 3 centimeters, but this craft is not autonomous in that it gets its power through a wire. The group has achieved controlled hovering flight in 2013 as well as landings on and takeoffs from different overhangs in 2016  (both inside a motion tracking environment).

The T-Hawk MAV, a ducted fan VTOL Micro-UAV, was developed by the United States company Honeywell and entered service in 2007. This MAV is used by the US Army and US Navy Explosive Ordnance Division to search areas for roadside bombs and inspect targets. The device was also deployed at the Fukushima Daiichi Nuclear Power Plant in Japan to provide video and radioactivity readings after the 2011 Tōhoku earthquake and tsunami.

In early 2008, Honeywell received FAA approval to operate its MAV, designated as gMAV in the national airspace on an experimental basis. The gMAV is the fourth MAV to receive such approval. The Honeywell gMAV uses ducted thrust for lift, allowing it to take off and land vertically and to hover. It is also capable of "high-speed" forward flight, according to the company, but no performance figures have been released. The company also states that the machine is light enough to be carried by a man. It was originally developed as part of a DARPA program, and its initial application is expected to be with the police department of Miami-Dade County, Florida.

In January 2010, Tamkang University (TKU) in Taiwan realized autonomous control of flight altitude of an 8-gram, 20-centimeter wide, flapping-wing MAV. The MEMS (MICRO-ELECTRO-MECHANICAL SYSTEMS) Lab of TKU had been developing MAVs for several years, and in 2007 the Space and Flight Dynamics (SFD) Lab joined the research team for the development of autonomous flight MAVs. Instead of traditional sensors and computational devices, which are too heavy for most MAVs, the SFD combined a stereo-vision system with a ground station to control the flight altitude, making it the first flapping-wing MAV under 10 grams that realized autonomous flight.

In 2012, the British Army deployed the sixteen gram Black Hornet Nano Unmanned Air Vehicle to Afghanistan to support infantry operations.

Practical limitations
Although there are currently no true MAVs (i.e., truly micro scaled flyers) in existence, DARPA has attempted a program to develop even smaller Nano Air Vehicles (NAVs) with a wingspan of 7.5 centimeters. However, no NAVs meeting DARPA's original program specification were forthcoming until 2009 when AeroVironment demonstrated a controlled hovering of DARPA's flapping-wing NAV.

Beyond the difficulties in developing MAVs, few designs adequately address control issues. The MAVs' small size makes teleoperation impractical because a ground station pilot cannot see it beyond 100 meters. An onboard camera allowing the ground pilot to stabilize and navigate the craft was first demonstrated in the Aerovironment Black Widow, but truly micro air vehicles cannot carry onboard transmitters powerful enough to allow for teleoperation. For this reason, some researchers have focused on fully autonomous MAV flight. One such device, which has been designed from its inception as a fully autonomous MAV, is the biologically-inspired Entomopter originally developed at the Georgia Institute of Technology under a DARPA contract by Robert C. Michelson.

Given that MAVs can be controlled by autonomous means, significant test and evaluation issues continue to exist. Some of the problems that might be encountered in physical vehicles are being approached through simulations of these models.

Bio-inspiration

A new trend in the MAV community is to take inspiration from flying insects or birds to achieve unprecedented flight capabilities. Biological systems are not only interesting to MAV engineers for their use of unsteady aerodynamics with flapping wings; they are increasingly inspiring engineers for other aspects such as distributed sensing and acting, sensor fusion and information processing. Recent research within the USAF has focused on development of bird like perching mechanism. A ground mobility and perching mechanism inspired from bird claws was recently developed by Vishwa Robotics and MIT and sponsored by US Air Force Research Laboratory

Various symposia bringing together biologists and aerial roboticists have been held with increasing frequency since 2000 and some books have recently been published on this topic. Bio-inspiration has been also used in design of methods for stabilization and control of systems of multiple MAVs. Researchers took inspiration from observed behaviors of schools of fish and flocks of birds to control artificial swarms of MAVs  and from rules observed in groups of migratory birds to stabilize compact MAV formations.

See also

 AeroVironment Nano Hummingbird
 Entomopter
 DelFly
 History of unmanned aerial vehicles
 Hybrid Insect Micro-Electro-Mechanical Systems
 Miniature helicopter
 Miniature UAVs
 Model aircraft
 Surveillance
 Unmanned aerial vehicle (UAV)
 Honeywell RQ-16 T-Hawk

References

Further reading
 
 Peter Forbes, The Gecko's Foot: How Scientists are Taking a Leaf from Nature's Book, Harper Perennial, 2006, pp. 161–179.
 Guo et al., An Autonomously Hopping-off Micro Raised-flapping-wing Air Vehicle, published in the 31st Chinese Control Conference, 2012.

External links
 Delfly.nl DelFly Micro photographs

 
Emerging technologies